Turanian is a term that has been used in reference to diverse groups of people. It has had currency in Turanism, Pan-Turkism, and historic Turkish nationalism.

Many of the uses of the word are obsolete. It may refer to:

The Turanid race
An Iranian ethnic group mentioned in the Avesta
See Turan
Any historical people of Transoxiana or present-day Turkestan
Obsolete term for any historical people speaking languages of the obsolete Ural–Altaic family, in particular:
The Turkic peoples during Turkic expansion
The Huns
Finnic peoples like the Finns, Estonians and Udmurts
Hungarians

See also
Turanid race
Altaic peoples
Hungarian Turanism
Turan
Turanism
Turkic peoples
Turanian languages

Pan-Turkism
Turanism
Turkish nationalism